Blood Drive is a vehicular combat video game for PlayStation 3 and Xbox 360, developed by Sidhe, published by Activision, and released worldwide in November 2010.

Plot
Inspired by bloodsport gameshow concepts like Death Race 2000, the 'Death Watch' from Platinum Games MadWorld, zombie fiction such as World War Z and the concept of humans & zombies learning to live together, Fido, Shaun of the Dead ; Blood Drive uncommonly takes place in the aftermath decades of a zombie apocalypse.

Entertainers in the fictional desert city of Las Ruletas have stumbled upon a tourism goldmine with the advent of the titular death sport 'Blood Drive'. The desert gambling resort sees champion 'Blood Drivers' compete for glory using muscle cars, big rigs, and even a dune buggy and an ambulance fitted with spikes and guns. The aim is to stay alive inside a hostile zombie-infested environment while also attempting to destroy opponent vehicles.

Players are introduced during a growth period for the sport, enjoying enough success in the post-apocalypse to see its evolution into a televised game show, with larger than life celebrity contestants, vast derelict cities transformed into arenas and all the fortune and glory expected of such a gambling mecca.

Gameplay
The player selects one of eight vehicles to drive and has to kill other players, while being attacked by zombies. The game features six expanded arenas in total. Multiplayer supports up to four players. The player will compete against other drivers in a tournament, and will complete different types of events. The players objectives will occasionally change. There are six main events, which feature different goals. The player will also be able to race, and will be able to kill other racers. The player has access to pick-ups including weaponry, health, and speed boosts. Killing a large number of zombies will activate the player's Rage Powers.

Reception

The game received negative reviews on both platforms according to the review aggregation website Metacritic.

References

External links
 

2010 video games
Activision games
PlayStation 3 games
Vehicular combat games
Video games developed in New Zealand
Xbox 360 games
Video games about zombies
Multiplayer and single-player video games
Sidhe (company) games